Gackenbach is an Ortsgemeinde – a community belonging to a Verbandsgemeinde – in the Westerwaldkreis in Rhineland-Palatinate, Germany. It belongs to the Verbandsgemeinde of Montabaur, a kind of collective municipality.

Geography

Location
Gackenbach lies in the Buchfinkenland in the southern Westerwald as well as in the geographical triangle between Koblenz, Limburg an der Lahn and Montabaur in the middle of the Nassau Nature Park.

Constituent communities

Dies
Dies lies below Gackenbach in the Gelbach Valley. It has roughly 65 inhabitants and is in a pleasant setting on the Gelbach. It is in the Gelbachtal which is very famous for motor bikers during the summer.

Kirchähr
The constituent community of Kirchähr also lies in the Gelbach Valley and consists mainly of the Karlsheim Kirchähr, a youth and meeting centre of the Bishopric of Limburg with its own campground for tents on the other side of the Gelbach.

History
In 1290, Gackenbach had its first documentary mention.

Politics

The municipal council is made up of 13 council members, including the extraofficial mayor (Bürgermeister), who were elected in a municipal election on 7 June 2009.

Culture and sightseeing

Wild- und Freizeitpark Westerwald
In Gackenbach is found the Wild- und Freizeitpark Westerwald (“Westerwald Wilderness and Amusement Park”), where visitors can observe many native species of animal as well as wisent in their natural habitat in an area of 4 ha. Also, there are a petting zoo, barbecue pits and a 400-m-long summer toboggan run.

Economy and infrastructure

F. Stephan Medizintechnik GmbH manufactures devices for medical use.

Notable people
 Martin Stadtfeld, pianist

References

External links
 Gackenbach 
 Gackenbach in pictures

Municipalities in Rhineland-Palatinate
Westerwaldkreis